Khagen Gogoi was an Indian politician belonging to Bharatiya Janata Party. He was elected as a member of Assam Legislative Assembly as an Indian National Congress candidate from Mahmora in 1972. He joined Bharatiya Janata Party in 1996. He died on 5 March 2019 at the age of 92.

References

Bharatiya Janata Party politicians from Assam
2019 deaths
Assam MLAs 1972–1978
1920s births
Indian National Congress politicians from Assam